Anthony Santos Menezes (born November 24, 1974) is a retired Canadian-Brazilian professional soccer player, who predominantly played as a defender and represented Canada national football team on 27 occasions between 1998 and 2003.

Personal life
A 6'1, 180 lb (82 kg) defender, Menezes was born in Mississauga, Ontario. He has a Brazilian mother and Portuguese father. When he was 10, he and his family immigrated to Brazil from Canada, where Tony was born.

Club career

Brazil
Menezes began his professional club career at Madureira EC in 1996 and appeared in Campeonato Carioca Série B1. He later moved to another Brazilian team America FC Rio in 1997 and played until 1998.

In 1999, he appeared with two different lower league clubs in Brazil, Bangu Atlético and Clube de Regatas Brasil before his stint in top flight side Botafogo between 2000 and 2001.

He signed with Campeonato Brasileiro Série A outfit Botafogo in Rio de Janeiro and appeared in 6 Campeonato Carioca league matches.

China
In 2002, he moved to Asia and joined Gansu Tianma F.C., where he appeared in 19 league matches. He then signed with China League One side Nanjing Yoyo and played in 17 league matches, scoring 3 goals. He again signed with a China League One outfit Zhejiang Lucheng in 2004. Menezes played as a defender but scored 4 goals in 22 league matches.

Canada
On April 19, 2006 he signed with a Canadian club for the first time, joining Toronto Lynx in the USL League Two. He played there for only one season.

In 2006, ge again moved to Brazil and played for SC Ulbra (RS). He with the club, competed in the Campeonato Brasileiro Série C, but was eliminated in the second stage of the competition.

India
In November 2006, he signed with the defending champions Mahindra United of Indian National Football League as their third foreign player. He debuted for the Jeepmen at the 2006 Durand Cup tournament in Delhi.

With Mahindra United, he appeared in two competitive seasons and won the IFA Shield in 2006. In the 2006–07 National Football League season, Mahindra finished 3rd in the league table. He has also represented Mahindra at the 2007 AFC Cup, where they qualified for the knockout stages, finishing 2nd in the Group-E behind Singapore Armed Forces but lost in the QF to Al-Najmeh of Lebanon (4–5 aggregate).

Back to Brazil
After two years in India, Menezes joined back to his homeland Brazil and signed in January 2008 with  Porto Alegre FC and played until 2010.

International career
He made his debut for Canada in a May 1998 friendly match against North Macedonia and earned a total of 27 caps, scoring no goals. He has represented Canada in four 2002 FIFA World Cup qualification matches between 2000 and 2001 and was a member of the 2000 CONCACAF Gold Cup title-winning squad. Winning the CONCACAF Gold Cup, is the biggest achievement of his long playing career. He has also represented Canada at the 2001 FIFA Confederations Cup in Japan.

His final international was a January 2003 friendly match against the United States, which ended as their 4-0 defeat.

He later appeared for the Beach soccer national team of Canada and played 3 matches in 2005.

Honours

International

Canada
CONCACAF Gold Cup 
 Champions (1): 2000

Club
Mahindra United
IFA Shield
 Champions (1): 2006

References

External links
  (archive)
 

1974 births
Living people
Soccer players from Mississauga
Canadian people of Brazilian descent
Canadian people of Portuguese descent
Brazilian people of Canadian descent
Canadian expatriate soccer players
Canadian expatriates in Brazil
Expatriate footballers in Brazil
Canadian soccer players
Canada men's international soccer players
Canadian beach soccer players
Footballers from Rio de Janeiro (city)
CONCACAF Gold Cup-winning players
2000 CONCACAF Gold Cup players
2001 FIFA Confederations Cup players
2002 CONCACAF Gold Cup players
America Football Club (RJ) players
Bangu Atlético Clube players
Botafogo de Futebol e Regatas players
Canadian expatriates in China
Expatriate footballers in China
Nanjing Yoyo players
Zhejiang Professional F.C. players
China League One players
Toronto Lynx players
Canadian expatriates in India
Expatriate footballers in India
National Football League (India) players
Association football defenders